Lac à la Loutre is a freshwater body of the watershed of the rivière aux Anglais, flowing in the unorganized territory of Rivière-aux-Outardes, in the Manicouagan Regional County Municipality, in the administrative region of Côte-Nord, in the province of Quebec, in Canada.

The surroundings of Lac à la Loutre are served by a few forest roads connecting from the south to the "Chemin de la rivière aux Anglais".

Forestry and hydroelectricity are the main economic activities around the lake.

Geography 
The "Lac à la Loutre" is located in the unorganized territory of Rivière-aux-Outardes, north of the city of Baie-Comeau. This lake turns out to be the main head water body on the slope of the rivière aux Anglais.

From the mouth of Lac à la Loutre, the current descends on  generally towards the south-east, following the course of the rivière aux Anglais, in particular passing by end of segment on the north side of an industrial sector in the eastern part of Baie-Comeau, to discharge onto the west shore of Baie aux Anglais, on the north shore of the Estuary of Saint Lawrence.

Toponym 
The toponym "lac à la Loutre" was formalized on December 5, 1968 at the Place Names Bank of the Commission de toponymie du Québec.

See also 
 Manicouagan Regional County Municipality
 Rivière-aux-Outardes, an unorganized territory
 Rivière aux Anglais, a stream
 Gulf of St. Lawrence, a stream
 List of rivers of Quebec

References 

 

Lakes of Côte-Nord
Manicouagan Regional County Municipality